Renault armoured cars were a number of armoured car variants produced in France during the First World War.

Like most of the armoured cars of the period they were developed from armoured bodies fitted to commercially available large car or truck chassis, in this case those from Renault, and armed with a machine gun or relatively small calibre gun.

Variants

Renault modele 1914 automitrailleuse
 Renault 18hp chassis with 95/160 engine. The first 100 were extemporised but a standard armoured body form followed with a machine gun at the rear. Together with twin rear tyres this formed the Modele 1915 variant

Renault autocanon
The same Renault chassis and armoured body as the Mle 1915 but with a 37mm gun protected by a shield.

Renault autoblindee
Renault AM with guns removed as used as unarmed transports. Some early AM had been fitted with single 8 mm Lebel St Étienne 1907 light machine gun for use as mobile anti-aircraft weapons. They had proved not to be effective in this role and were disarmed.

References 
 Bartholomew, E., Early Armoured Cars, Osprey Publishing. 1988 
 Bishop, Chris, The Illustrated Encyclopedia of Weapons of World War I, Amber Books p. 23, London 2014 
 Bradford, George, 1914-1938 Armored Fighting Vehicles (Afv Plans), Stackpole Books 2010 
 Crow, Duncan, Armoured Fighting Vehicles of the World: A.F.V.'s of World War One v. 1, Profile 1970 
 Forty, George,; Livesey, Jack, The World Encyclopedia of Tanks and Armoured Fighting Vehicles, Anness Publishing Ltd. p. 364. London 2006 
 Gougaud, Alain, L'aube de la gloire: les autos mitrailleuses et les chars français pendant la Grande Guerre, histoire technique et militaire, arme blindée, cavalerie, chars, Musée des blindés. Société OCEBUR 1987 
 Hogg, Ian V.; Weeks, John, The illustrated encyclopedia of military vehicles, New Burlington Books. p. 182, London 1980 
 Trewhitt, Philip, Armored Fighting Vehicles, Dempsey Parr 1999 
 Zaloga, Steven, French Tanks of World War II (2): cavalry tanks and AFVs, Bloomsbury Publishing. p. 69, London 2014

External links 
Kempft, P Renault mle 1914 Armoured Car Landships II
Renault Armoured Car mle 1914

Armoured cars of_France
World War I armoured cars